Yarragon railway station is located on the Gippsland line in Victoria, Australia. It serves the town of Yarragon, and it opened on 1 August 1878 as Waterloo. It was renamed Yarragon on 17 December 1883.

In 1952, the line between Warragul and Yarragon was duplicated. In 1955, electrification of the line was extended from Warragul to Moe, passing through the station. In 1958, duplication of the line to Trafalgar occurred.

On 2 July 1987, electrification between Warragul and Traralgon ceased. During August 1988, the double line block system between Yarragon and Warragul was abolished, with automatic three position signalling introduced. Switching out facilities were also provided at Yarragon during this time.

Steam locomotive K162 is on display, opposite the entrance to Platform 1. This locomotive was exchanged for K183 of the same class, when Steamrail Victoria deemed the latter to be in better condition. K183's tender remained, and thus K162 was painted as K183.

A disused goods platform exists behind Platform 2. By 2019, it was partly demolished, and the rail was removed.

Platforms and services

Yarragon has two side platforms. It is serviced by V/Line Traralgon and selected Bairnsdale line services.

Platform 1:
 services to Traralgon, Bairnsdale and Southern Cross

Platform 2:
 services to Traralgon, Bairnsdale and Southern Cross

Transport links

Warragul Bus Lines operates two routes via Yarragon station, under contract to Public Transport Victoria:
Garfield station – Traralgon Plaza
Traralgon station – Drouin North

References

External links

Victorian Railway Stations Gallery
Melway map

Railway stations in Australia opened in 1878
Regional railway stations in Victoria (Australia)
Transport in Gippsland (region)
Shire of Baw Baw